Klingel is a surname. Notable people with the surname include:

 Gilbert Klingel (1908–1983), naturalist, boatbuilder, adventurer, photographer, author, inventor, and contributor to the Baltimore Sun
 Johannes Klingel, known for the Klingel's formula
 John Klingel (born 1963), American football player